Every is an English surname. Eber or Ivri was the descendant of Noah's son Shem and the ancestor of Abraham. In modern Hebrew, Évry is actually the word for "Hebrew". Eber's name is found on some of the earliest known examples of Sumerian writing. It may be of Norman origin and derived from "Évreux", a county in Normandy. The Every baronets of Egginton, a branch of the Every family of southwest England, are claimed to be a branch of the noble house of Yvery, of Norman extraction. The earliest surviving records of the name "Every" date to 12 April 1591, when one John Every married Elizabeth Ouzely at St Dunstan's, Stepney.

People
 Dernell Every (1909–1994), American fencer
 George Every (1909–2003), British historian and theologian
 Henry Every (c.1659–?), English pirate
 Matt Every (born 1983), American golfer
 Trevor Every (1909–1990), Welsh cricketer
 Every baronets, which includes a list of baronets with the surname:
 Sir Simon Every, 1st Baronet (1603–1647), English politician

References

See also
 Van Every

Surnames
English-language surnames
Surnames of English origin
Surnames of Welsh origin
Surnames of British Isles origin